Larry Sykes (born April 11, 1973) is an American former professional basketball player born in Toledo, Ohio.

A 6'9" power forward from Xavier University, Sykes appeared in one game for the Boston Celtics during the 1995-96 NBA season. He tallied two rebounds and one turnover in two minutes of action. Sykes also played for the Rockford Lightning and Fort Wayne Fury of the Continental Basketball Association.

Sykes later became an assistant coach at Lakota East High School in Cincinnati, Ohio, for the girls varsity basketball team.

Personal life
Sykes uncle, Fred Foster, played eight years in the NBA with five teams from 1969 to 1977.

References

1973 births
Living people
American men's basketball players
Basketball players from Ohio
Boston Celtics players
Fort Wayne Fury players
High school basketball coaches in the United States
Power forwards (basketball)
Rockford Lightning players
Sportspeople from Toledo, Ohio
Undrafted National Basketball Association players
Xavier Musketeers men's basketball players